Harry W. Gerstad (born Harry Donald Gerstad; June 11, 1909 – July 17, 2002) was an American film editor who sometimes directed films.  The Academy Award-winning editor also worked on television.  He edited as well as directed for the 1950s program Adventures of Superman.  In the 1960s he worked for Bing Crosby Productions and Batjac Productions.  Gerstad retired to Palm Springs, California in 1973 and lived there until his death in 2002.

Awards and nominations
He won the Academy Award for Best Film Editing (the "Oscar") twice: for the boxing drama Champion in 1949 and for Fred Zinnemann's seminal Western High Noon in 1952. Elmo Williams, who was co-editor of High Noon, indicated in his autobiography that Gerstad's credit was a nominal one.  At that time the editorial supervisor (Gerstad) was usually (and often contractually) given superior credit to subordinate editors (Williams), and one responsibility of Gerstad's position was selecting and hiring  Williams, who only worked on this one Stanley Kramer production.

In 1997, Gerstad received the American Cinema Editors Career Achievement Award.

Gerstad was honored with a Palm Springs Walk of Stars Golden Palm Star in 2003.

Filmography

Editor
 Brazil (film editor – not credited) 1944
 The Spiral Staircase (film editor) (1946)
 Till the End of Time (film editor) 1946
 Crossfire (film editor) (1947)
 So Well Remembered (film editor) 1947
 Unknown Island (film editor) 1948
 Champion (film editor) 1949
 Home of the Brave (film editor) 1949
 Tough Assignment (film editor) (1949)
 Gun Crazy (film editor) 1950
 The Men (film editor) 1950
 Rocketship X-M (film editor) (1950)
 Cyrano de Bergerac (film editor) 1950
 Death of a Salesman (editorial supervisor) 1951
 Eight Iron Men (editorial supervisor) 1952
 The Happy Time (editorial supervisor) 1952
 My Six Convicts (editorial supervisor) 1952
 The Sniper (editorial supervisor) 1952
 High Noon (editorial supervisor) 1952
 The Four Poster (editorial supervisor) 1952
 Combat Squad (film editor) 1953
 The 5,000 Fingers of Dr. T. (editorial supervisor) 1953
 The Juggler (editorial supervisor) 1953
 The Member of the Wedding (editorial supervisor) 1953
 Frontier Gun (film editor) 1958
 The Alligator People (supervising film editor) 1959
 Five Gates to Hell (supervising editor) 1959
 Here Come the Jets (supervising film editor) 1959
 The Rookie (supervising film editor) 1959
 Freckles (supervising film editor) 1960
 13 Fighting Men (film editor) 1960
 Young Jesse James (film editor) 1960
 The Magic Sword (film editor) 1962
 Walk on the Wild Side (film editor) 1962
 Of Love and Desire (film editor) 1963
 Batman (film editor) (1966)
 The War Wagon (film editor) (1967)
 The Secret Life of an American Wife (film editor) 1968
 Hard Contract (film editor) 1969
 Cover Me Babe (film editor) 1970
 Big Jake (film editor) 1971
 Ben (film editor) 1972
 Walking Tall (film editor) (1973)
 Framed (film editor) 1975

Director
 13 Fighting Men (director) (1960)

References

External links
 

1909 births
2002 deaths
American film editors
Best Film Editing Academy Award winners
People from Palm Springs, California